Midas International, LLC is an American chain of automotive service centers headquartered in Palm Beach Gardens, Florida. In its North American main and home market, Midas stores are company-owned or franchised.  In the 17 other countries it operates in, the service centers are either licensed or franchised. Midas is one of the world’s largest providers of automotive services, offering brake, maintenance, tires, exhaust, steering and suspension services at more than 2,100 franchised, licensed and company-owned Midas shops in 13 countries, including nearly 1,300 in the United States of America and Canada. Midas also owns the SpeeDee Oil & Auto Service business, with more than 150 auto service centers in America. Midas has ranked #150 on Entrepreneurs top Franchise 500.

History
In April 1956, Midas, an acronym of  Muffler Installation Dealers' Association, was established by Nate H. Sherman  (1898 - 1980) and the first Midas Muffler opened that year in Macon, Georgia. The chain was originally known as Midas Muffler as they specialized in the replacement of mufflers. In recent years, they have marketed themselves as Auto Service Experts, as they are capable of performing most routine and common automobile service, including brakes, fluid changes, and suspensions. The name is derived from the king Midas and his golden touch, hence the slogan "Trust the Midas touch".

Midas was acquired by TBC Corporation in 2012.

Slogans
 Nobody beats Midas. Nobody. (1977–1986)
 The Midas Way. The way it should be. (1987–1996)
 You should trust a Midas touch (1995–2000)
 Trust the Midas touch (2001–)
 Trust Midas (2006–2007)

Fraud charges
A Midas franchisee was sued by the state of California in 2009 for using bait-and-switch method of defrauding consumers. In 22 locations throughout the state, the locations were accused of luring customers into the store by advertising cheap auto-service, and then upselling them by up to $1,700. The findings came after a four-year undercover investigation.

Midas in TV
Midas has been represented in television commercials by a fictional character and spokesman called the "Midas Man". The character has been portrayed by actor Ralph Peduto.

Western icon Lee Van Cleef appears in a series of innovative commercials for the Midas Muffler chain. He played the part of the laconic cowboy (as in 1960s "spaghetti westerns") who could fix a muffler or tailpipe with such speed that John Colicos (playing the straight-man store manager) would be amazed to see him lounging in a chair propped up against a wall on the side of the shop with his hat down in less time than it takes to write this. The commercials include many guest stars and some fellow Western icons, including John Phillip Law, George Kennedy, Jack Palance, Henry Silva, and Bo Hopkins.

International Midas Dealers Association

The International Midas Dealers Association (IMDA) is a not-for-profit corporation of Midas dealers. According to its bylaws, the association's purpose is to advocate for and enhance profitability of its dealers.

The association begain in 1970 as the National Muffler Dealers Association by eight Midas dealers. The association changed its name in 1979 to the National Midas Dealers Association and then again in 1994 to the International Midas Dealers Association when Canadians were invited to join the association.

The IMDA is led by a 12-person Board of Directors.

References

External links

 

TBC Corporation
American companies established in 1956
Retail companies established in 1956
Automotive repair shops of the United States
Itasca, Illinois
Companies based in DuPage County, Illinois
Companies listed on the New York Stock Exchange